William Mitchell (December 1, 1889 – November 23, 1973) born in Pleasant Grove, Mississippi, was a pitcher for the Cleveland Naps/Indians  (-) and Detroit Tigers (-).

In 11 seasons, he had an 84–92 record in 276 games pitched with 93 complete games, 16 shutouts, 4 saves, 1632 innings pitched, 605 walks allowed, 921 strikeouts, 75 hit batsmen, 48 wild pitches and a 2.88 ERA. He was the first pitcher to strike out Babe Ruth which happened at Fenway Park.

He died in Sardis, Mississippi, at the age of 83.

References

External links

1889 births
1973 deaths
People from Panola County, Mississippi
Major League Baseball pitchers
Baseball players from Mississippi
Cleveland Naps players
Cleveland Indians players
Detroit Tigers players
San Antonio Bronchos players
Vernon Tigers players
Topeka Kaws players
Topeka Senators players
Mississippi State Bulldogs baseball players